Algorithmic regulation may refer to:

 Government by algorithm, use of algorithms in government
 Regulation of algorithms, rules and laws for algorithms